Abdolmajid Mahdavi Damghani is an Iranian agroecologist and associate professor at Shahid Beheshti University. 
His book Sustainable Production of Agricultural Products was praised in the ceremony for the Iran Book of the Year Award.

Books
 An Introduction to Organic Agriculture, with Behnam Kamkar, ACECR, 2008, 
 Principles of Sustainable Agriculture, with Hossein Mahmmodi and Hooman Liaghati, ACECR, 2011, 
 Sustainable Production of Agricultural Products, with Eskandar Zand and Alireza Koochaki, Iran University Press, 2013,

See also
Papaver somniferum

References

External links
Abdolmajid Mahdavi Damghani

Living people
Date of birth missing (living people)
Iranian ecologists
Agroecologists
Academic staff of Shahid Beheshti University
Ferdowsi University of Mashad alumni
Year of birth missing (living people)